Buckeye is a city in Maricopa County, Arizona, United States, and is the westernmost suburb in the Phoenix metropolitan area. As of the 2020 census the population was 91,502, up from 50,876 in 2010 and 6,537 in 2000. It was the fastest-growing city in the United States for both 2017 and 2018.

History
In 1877, Thomas Newt Clanton led a group of six men, three women, and ten children from Creston, Iowa, to Arizona, where they settled in the Buckeye area.

Early settler Malie M. Jackson developed  of the Buckeye Canal from 1884 to 1886, which he named after his home state of Ohio's moniker, "The Buckeye State". The town was founded in 1888 and originally named "Sidney", after Jackson's hometown in Ohio. However, because of the significance of the canal, the town became known as Buckeye. The name was legally changed to Buckeye in 1910. The town was incorporated in 1929, at which time it included . The town's first mayor was Hugh M. Watson (1956–1958), who founded the Buckeye Valley Bank. Today, Watson Road is the site of the city's commercial center.

In 2008, Buckeye was featured on The NewsHour with Jim Lehrer as part of a week-long series entitled "Blueprint America".

A vote to designate the town as the City of Buckeye became effective in 2014.

In May 2019, population estimates released by the U.S. Census Bureau placed Buckeye as the fastest growing city in the United States by percentage from 2017–2018, growing by 8.5%.

Geography
Interstate 10 passes through the central part of the city, north of the original town center. U.S. Route 80 once passed through the city, while Arizona State Route 85 skirts what was the city's west edge.

The Gila River flows westward through the Buckeye Valley south of the center of the city. The Buckeye Hills and Little Rainbow Valley are to the south, beyond which the city limits extend as far as Margies Peak. To the north the city limits include the southern part of the White Tank Mountains and continue north nearly as far as Circle City. The Hassayampa River, a tributary of the Gila, flows southward through the northern part of the Buckeye city limits.

Soils in Buckeye are alkaline and mostly well drained loam or clay loam except in northern neighborhoods such as Verrado, where gravelly sand or sandy loam with varying degrees of excessive drainage are common.

Neighborhoods
The original Buckeye was built around downtown's main street, Monroe Avenue. There are currently nearly 30 master planned communities planned for Buckeye. Those communities under development in which homes are occupied include Riata West, Sundance, Verrado, Westpark, Tartesso and Festival Ranch.

Other unbuilt planned communities within Buckeye include Douglas Ranch (planned for nearly 300,000 inhabitants), Sun Valley Villages, Spurlock Ranch, Trillium, Elianto, Westwind, Silver Rock, Sienna Hills, Henry Park, Southwest Ranch and Montierre.

Sundance Towne Center, a shopping center developed by Vestar Development in the Sundance community, opened in 2007.

Climate
Buckeye has a hot desert climate (Köppen BWh), with abundant sunshine due to the stable descending air of the eastern side of the subtropical anticyclone aloft and at sea level over the southwestern United States. Summers, as with most of the Sonoran Desert, are extremely hot, with 121.0 afternoons reaching  and 181.6 afternoons reaching . The record high temperature of  occurred on July 28, 1995, and temperatures above  may occur in any month. Cooler weather may occasionally occur during summer, but such periods are no less unpleasant as they result from monsoonal weather, with its attendant higher cloudiness and humidity; however, actual rainfall from the monsoon is much more infrequent than in Flagstaff, Nogales or even Tucson.

The winter season from November to March is warm to very warm during the day, not much cooler than  during a typical afternoon, but 20.2 mornings typically fall to or below , though no snowfall was recorded during the 1971 to 2000 period, and only twelve afternoons did not reach .

Demographics

Buckeye first appeared on the 1910 U.S. Census as a precinct of Maricopa County. It appeared again in 1920 as the 48th precinct of Maricopa County (Buckeye). It incorporated as a town in 1929 and has appeared on every successive census. On January 1, 2014, Buckeye was upgraded to city status.

In 2015, the population of the city was 62,582 people living in 21,628 households.

As of the census of 2010, there were 50,876 people residing in 16,499 households in the city. There were 18,207 housing units. 10.8% of the population were born overseas.

In terms of age brackets, the population was spread out, with 9.1% under the age of 5; 30.6% under the age of 18; 53% aged between 18 and 64 and 6.7% were 65 years of age or older. 45.4% percent of the population are women.

From 2012 to 2016, the median income for a household in the town was $58,711. The per capita income for the town was $20,446. Both of these numbers are in 2016 dollars. About 12.4% of the population were below the poverty line.

Parks and recreation

A popular recreation destination in Buckeye is the Buckeye Hills Recreation Area. A  Buckeye Lake is planned.

The City of Buckeye's Skyline Regional Park is an  mountain preserve located in the southern White Tank Mountains. As of August 2020, the park features just under  of trails for hikers, mountain bikers and equestrians, picnic areas and camping. Entry to the park is free.

Education
The city of Buckeye is served by the following school districts:
 Wickenburg Unified School District
 Saddle Mountain Unified School District #90
 Agua Fria Union High School District
 Buckeye Union High School District
 Arlington Elementary School District
 Buckeye Elementary School District
 Liberty Elementary School District
 Litchfield Elementary School District
 Morristown Elementary School District
 Palo Verde Elementary School District

Other schools:
 The Odyssey Preparatory Academy

Estrella Mountain Community College recently renovated the original historic Buckeye Union High School building on Eason Avenue near 9th Street, also known as the "A" Wing, and started holding classes in this new satellite facility in the fall of 2011.  Named the Buckeye Educational Center, this facility provides academic courses, job training programs and community education classes.

Media
There are several local newspapers, including the West Valley View, and The Arizona Republics Southwest Valley edition and the Buckeye Valley News.

Infrastructure

Transportation
Buckeye is served by five highways, a municipal airport, several nearby airports, and the railroad.

Roads
Major roadways serving the city include:
  Interstate 10
 
 Sun Valley Parkway
 Maricopa County (MC) 85

Bus
Buckeye is served by Valley Metro via a rural bus line connecting Phoenix–Goodyear–Gila Bend–Ajo. Valley Metro also provides express commute service from Buckeye to downtown Phoenix.

Rail
In 1910, the Arizona Eastern Railroad came to Buckeye; the first car in 1911; a steam rail line connected it to Phoenix by 1912; and a state highway by 1915. The coming of the railroad was so significant that the business district was moved to accommodate the location of the railroad station. As a result, Buckeye was booming. By 1912, major buildings were constructed, along with expansion of the business community.

Union Pacific operates a rail line running east–west generally through the center of the city.

Air
The Buckeye Municipal Airport (ICAO identifier KBXK) is owned and operated by the city government.

Notable people
 Kole Calhoun, Arizona Diamondbacks outfielder (2012–present)
 Sue Hardesty (1933-2022), writer
 Upton Sinclair (1878–1968), author

References

External links

 

Cities in Maricopa County, Arizona
Cities in Arizona
Phoenix metropolitan area
Populated places in the Sonoran Desert
1888 establishments in Arizona Territory
Populated places established in 1888